The 2001 Miami Dolphins season was the franchise's 32nd season in the National Football League and the 36th season in the AFC division under the guidance of Dave Wannstedt, who was entering his 2nd year as Dolphins head coach. The Miami Dolphins finished the season 2nd in the AFC East with a record of 11–5. Their season ended with a defeat to the defending Super Bowl champions, the Baltimore Ravens, in the Wild Card round of the playoffs.

The Miami Dolphins ranked 8th in points scored and 11th in points allowed.

The Dolphins did not return to the playoffs until 2008.

Offseason

NFL draft

Undrafted free agents

Staff

Roster

Regular season

Schedule

Standings

Playoffs

Wild Card vs Ravens

AFC: Baltimore Ravens 20, Miami Dolphins 3

The Ravens recorded 222 rushing yards, while limiting the Dolphins to 151 total yards and nine first downs, while forcing three turnovers and three sacks. Baltimore running back Terry Allen ran for 109 yards and a touchdown, while quarterback Elvis Grbac completed 12 of 18 passes for 133 yards and a touchdown. Throughout the day, the Dolphins were unable to move the ball on the ground. Running backs Travis Minor and Lamar Smith were held to a combined total of 20 yards on 11 carries, while quarterback Jay Fiedler ended up as the leading rusher with 16 yards. In contrast, the Ravens called 50 running plays, gained 222 rushing yards, and held the ball for 38 minutes.

The Dolphins' only score was Olindo Mare's 33-yard field goal just two minutes into the game, after linebacker Tommy Hendricks recovered a fumble from Baltimore's Jermaine Lewis on the opening kickoff. In the second quarter, the Ravens finished a 17-play, 90-yard drive with a 4-yard touchdown run from Allen to take a 7–3 lead. Baltimore later had a chance to increase their lead before halftime when linebacker Peter Boulware recovered Minor's fumble on the Dolphins 41-yard line, but their ensuing drive ended without points when Matt Stover missed a 40-yard field goal attempt on the last play of the half.

Later in the game, Grbac led the Ravens on a 99-yard scoring drive, featuring a 45-yard completion to Travis Taylor on third down and 1. Taylor finished the drive with a 4-yard touchdown catch to give the Ravens a 14–3 lead with 1:20 left in the third quarter.

Early in the final quarter, Boulware forced a fumble while sacking Fiedler that Ravens lineman Sam Adams recovered on the Dolphins 37-yard line, leading to Stover's 35-yard field goal with 11:26 left in the game. The Dolphins responded with a drive to the Ravens 41. On first and 10, Fiedler's 40-yard pass to James McKnight at the Ravens 5-yard line bounced off the receiver's shoulder and was intercepted by defensive back Duane Starks, who returned the ball 26 yards to the 28-yard line. Baltimore's offense subsequently drove 50 yards and took 6:30 off the clock, including five carries by Jason Brookins for 36 yards, setting up Stover's second field goal to put the game away.

References

Miami
Miami Dolphins seasons
Miami Dolphins